Carles Torrens (born 1984) is a Spanish film and television director, screenwriter, editor, and producer, known for his award-winning short films and his 2011 feature film debut Apartment 143 (Emergo).

Background
Torrens was born in Barcelona, Spain in 1984, and lived there until he turned 18.  He moved to the United States to pursue film and graduated from Chapman University where he completed the short films Coming to Town in 2006 and Delaney in 2008.  After graduating, he directed Apartment 143  marking it as his 2011 feature film debut.

Filmography
His film project Pet, starring Dominic Monaghan, Ksenia Solo, Jennette McCurdy, and Nathan Parsons debuted at the South by Southwest Film festival during March 2016.  Writer Brant Hughes brought a film pitch forVisceral to Solipsist Films and, based upon the success of Apartment 143 and Sequence, Torrens was brought aboard the project as director.

Television
 Días de cine (2 episodes, 2011-2013) as Himself
 Sala 33 (1 episode 2013) as Himself
 VI Premis Gaudí de l'Acadèmia del Cinema Català (2014) as Himself

Film

 Beyond Re-Animator (2003) (assistant screenwriter)
 Frank's First Love (2005) (editor)
 Coming to Town (2006) (writer, director, editor)
 Plou a Barcelona (2008) (director)
 Greg and Emilia (2008) as Groomsman
 Delaney (film) (2008) (writer, director)
 In Utero (2010) (writer)
 Noel Schajris: Momentos (2010) (writer, director)
  (2010) as Bailarín Agresivo
 Apartment 143 (2011) (director)
 M Is for Mom (2013) (director) (submitted for ABCs of Death 2, later published as part of ABCs of Death 2.5)
 Sequence (2013) (writer, director)
 Les Nenes no Haurien de Jugar al Futbol (2014) (producer)
  Hide and Seek (2014) (director)
 Pet (2016) (director, producer).
 Visceral (pre-production, 2016) (director)

Recognition
In 2012, Film de Culte referred to Torrens "a promising director".

Partial awards and nominations
 2007, won Audience Award for 'Best Short Film' at Sci-Fi-London for Coming to Town
 2009, Won 'Best Dark Comedy' Jury Award for at Hollywood International Student Film Festival for Delaney 
 2010, Won 'Premi Serra Circular' at Cryptshow Festival de Badalona for Delaney
 2010, Won Festival Prize for Best Horror/Thriller at Route 66 Film Festival for Delaney 
 2010, nominated for Gaudi Award for 'Best TV-Movie' by Catalan Academy of Cinema for Plou a Barcelona
 2013, Won 'Best of the Fest Award' at LA Shorts Fest for Sequence
 2013, Won 'Best Direction' Grand Jury Prize at 24FPS International Short Film Festival for Sequence
 2013, Nominated for Maria Award for Best Short Film at Sitges - Catalan International Film Festival for Sequence
 2013, Nominated for 'Short Grand Prix' at Warsaw International Film Festival for Sequence
 2014, Won 'International Competition' Canal+ Award at Clermont-Ferrand International Short Film Festival for Sequence
 2014, Won Faro de Plata at Festival de Cine de L'Alfàs del Pi for Sequence
 2014, nominated for Deadline Award at Landshut Short Film Festival for Sequence
 2014, nominated for Gaudi Award for 'Best Short Film by Catalan Academy of Cinema for Sequence
 2014, nominated for Short Films: Special Jury Award Silver Biznaga at Málaga Spanish Film Festival for Sequence
 2014, Nominated for 'Best Narrative Short' at Tribeca Film Festival for Sequence

References

External links
 
 

1984 births
Living people
American film producers
Spanish film producers
American film directors
Spanish film directors
American male film actors
American male television actors
Spanish emigrants to the United States
American male screenwriters
Spanish male screenwriters
Chapman University alumni
People from Barcelona